Black Swan: Original Motion Picture Soundtrack is the soundtrack album to the 2010 film Black Swan.

Overview
The album marked the fifth consecutive collaboration between Aronofsky and English composer Clint Mansell. Mansell scored the film based on Tchaikovsky's ballet Swan Lake, but with radical changes to the music. Because of the use of Tchaikovsky's music, the score was deemed ineligible to be entered into the 2010 Academy Awards for Best Original Score.

Violinist Tim Fain was featured in performance both on-screen and in the soundtrack of Black Swan, and the film also featured various new pieces of music by English production duo The Chemical Brothers, although they are not featured on the official soundtrack.

Track listing

References

External links
 
 Soundtracks for 'Black Swan' at Internet Movie Database
 Soundtrack review for 'Black Swan' at Tracksounds

2010 soundtrack albums
Horror film soundtracks
Instrumental soundtracks
Clint Mansell soundtracks
Swan Lake